The eighteenth series of Made in Chelsea, a British structured-reality television programme began airing on 2 September 2019, and concluded on 11 November 2019 following eleven episodes. For the first time since 2013, a Summer spin-off did not air between the two main series. Instead, one will follow later in the year. New cast members for this series included Reza Amiri-Garroussi and Zara McDermott, who had previously appeared on Love Island. This series also featured the return of former cast members Sam Thompson, Emily Blackwell, Tristan Phipps and Tabitha Willett.

This series focused heavily on the beginning of James and Maeva's relationship despite obstacles in the shape of Miles and Verity, as well as Jamie attempting to make amends with former best friend Sam after breaking his trust. It also included Olivia receive some life changing opportunities, and Emily and Verity competing for Tristan.

Cast

Episodes

{| class="wikitable plainrowheaders" style="width:100%; background:#fff;"
! style="background:#FB65FE;"| Seriesno.
! style="background:#FB65FE;"| Episodeno.
! style="background:#FB65FE;"| Title
! style="background:#FB65FE;"| Original air date
! style="background:#FB65FE;"| Duration
! style="background:#FB65FE;"| UK viewers

|}

Ratings
Catch-up service totals were added to the official ratings.

External links

References

2019 British television seasons
Made in Chelsea seasons